Now That's What I Call Music! 5 or Now 5 may refer to at least four different "Now That's What I Call Music!"-series albums, including
 Now That's What I Call Music 5 (original UK series, 1985 release)
 Now That's What I Call Music! 5 (U.S. series, 2000 release) 
 Now 05 (Australian series, 2004 release)
 Now That's What I Call Music 5 (Hungarian series)